Dana Frederick White Jr. (born July 28, 1969) is an American businessman who serves as president of the Ultimate Fighting Championship (UFC), a global mixed martial arts organization. In August 2019, White's net worth was estimated at $500 million.

Early life and education
White was born in Manchester, Connecticut, to June and Dana White Sr., on July 28, 1969. He is an Irish American. White spent many of his early years residing in Ware, Massachusetts.

White and his sister, Kelly, were raised by their mother and her family for the majority of their childhoods. White's mother was a nurse, and the family moved to Las Vegas when White was in third grade, as Vegas offered higher wages for nurses. White attended Bishop Gorman High School, where he first met Lorenzo Fertitta, although they did not become close friends until years later. White said he disliked school and "got kicked out of Gorman twice". Despite living in Nevada, the Whites returned to the East Coast in the summers, to spend time with White's grandparents in Levant, Maine, a small town near Bangor. White spent his senior year of high school in Maine.

After graduating from Hermon High School in 1987, White started college twice, once at Quincy College and once at UMass Boston, but dropped out during his first semester each time. During this time, he had various jobs, such as laying asphalt, working as a bouncer at an Irish bar, and being a bellhop at the Boston Harbor Hotel. White had begun boxing at age 17, and befriended former Golden Gloves champion Peter Welch. Through this relationship, White decided he wanted to enter the fight business, and he started a boxing gym in Boston with Welch. White initially intended to become a professional boxer himself, but was put off the idea after seeing a punch drunk boxer and worrying that he would suffer the same neurodegeneration. 
White then worked as a boxercise coach.

White has stated he left Boston to return to Las Vegas after being threatened by mobster Whitey Bulger and his associate Kevin Weeks. "He basically said, 'You owe us money'. It was like $2,500, which was like $25,000 to me back then, and I didn't pay him. This went on for a while and one day I was at my place and I got a call and they said, 'You owe us the money tomorrow by 1 o'clock'. I literally hung up the phone, picked up the phone and called Delta and bought a ticket to Vegas."

In Las Vegas, White continued running boxercise gyms and also began training jiu-jitsu under John Lewis, alongside Lorenzo Fertitta and his older brother Frank Fertitta III. It was in Lewis' practises where White met Tito Ortiz and Chuck Liddell and ultimately became their manager.

Career

Ultimate Fighting Championship
While working as a manager for Ortiz and Liddell, White met Bob Meyrowitz, the owner of Semaphore Entertainment Group, the parent company of the Ultimate Fighting Championship. When White learned that Meyrowitz was looking to sell the UFC, he contacted childhood friend Lorenzo Fertitta (an executive and co-founder of Station Casinos, and former commissioner of the Nevada State Athletic Commission), to ask if he would be interested in acquiring the company. In January 2001, Lorenzo and his older brother Frank acquired the UFC for $2 million, which subsequently became a subsidiary of Zuffa. White was installed as the company's president.

White said that when he and the Fertittas acquired the UFC, all they received was the brand name "UFC" and an old octagon. The previous owners had stripped the company's assets to avoid bankruptcy, so much so that the UFC.com website had been sold to a company named "User Friendly Computers". Over time, with White as president, the UFC developed into a highly successful business, and its gross revenue was $600 million in 2015. In July 2016, Zuffa was sold to a consortium of investors led by WME-IMG for $4.025 billion. White owned 9% of the company at the time of the sale. White continued in his role as president, and was given a stake in the new business.

In May 2017, the UFC announced White would host Dana White's Contender Series. Available exclusively through UFC Fight Pass, the promotion's digital streaming service, and licensed separately from the UFC brand, the show allows up and coming fighters the chance to showcase their talents in hopes that one day they may compete in the UFC.

On March 18, 2019, White signed a new, seven-year contract to remain president of the UFC, as the UFC signed a deal with ESPN.

Boxing
White entered the boxing scene by co-promoting Floyd Mayweather Jr. vs. Conor McGregor due to McGregor being contracted to the UFC. In October 2017, White said at Freddie Roach's Wild Card West boxing club that he was "getting into boxing, 100 percent." White said in 2019 that he wanted to incorporate boxing into the company portfolio of the UFC. He has since backpedaled on these plans, stating in 2022 that boxing promotion is "a broken business that is an absolute nightmare to try to fix".

Slap fighting
White is the producer of Power Slap, a slap fighting competition televised on TBS, which debuted in January 2023.

Personal life
White met his wife Anne (née Stella) when they were in the eighth grade and they married in 1996. They have two sons and one daughter. White bought a mansion in Pine Island Court, Las Vegas in 2006 from Frank Fertitta III for $1.95 million. White bought three other mansions in the same area from October 2016 to June 2017 for a combined total of around $6.2 million. Demolition permits were issued for the houses, presumably with the intent of creating a mega-mansion for White and his family.

White was raised as a Catholic, but now considers himself to be an atheist.

In 2011, White's mother, June, released the book Dana White, King of MMA: An Unauthorized Biography. June claimed in the book that, since his success with the UFC, Dana had "turned his back on his family and friends who were there for him when he needed help and support".

In a season 15 episode of History Channel's Pawn Stars (originally airing on February 5, 2018), White purchased around $60,000 worth of Katana swords, including one of Rick Harrison's 17th-century Japanese Katana.

White is a fan of the Beastie Boys, Red Hot Chili Peppers and Rage Against the Machine. Speaking on the passing of Adam Yauch, White said "I seriously haven't been impacted by a death in a long time like I was with the Beastie Boys". White also has a hand-signed guitar by all three members of the Beastie Boys in his office, alongside a copy of the Beastie Boys Book on the desk.

White is a big fan of the New England Patriots, he admits in an interview with the BBC he had Patriots shirts in his closet as a kid and Patriots star Tom Brady is his celebrity man crush.

Politics 
White spoke at the 2016 Republican National Convention in Cleveland, Ohio, where he endorsed Republican nominee Donald Trump. White said that Trump helped the UFC at its beginnings, allowing the UFC to host its first event under Zuffa ownership (UFC 30) at the Trump Taj Mahal when other venues refused to host the UFC. White said, "No arenas wanted us. This guy reached out, and he's always been a friend to me." White reiterated his support for Trump for the 2020 election and spoke at the podium at a Trump reelection rally  in Colorado. In February 2020, White donated $1 million to America First Action, a super political action committee that supported Trump's re-election. In April 2020, White joined a group of industry leaders to help the United States rebuild its economy hit by the coronavirus pandemic.

Sex-tape lawsuit 
White was accused in a sex-tape scandal, when an exotic dancer allegedly taped a sexual encounter with White in Brazil around the year 2014 without his consent. The stripper also alleged White had been seeing her for months during his marriage. The stripper's live-in boyfriend then tried to extort money from White, which resulted in a criminal case against her boyfriend.

In Nevada, on April 3, 2020, a civil suit against White was filed, claiming he offered the boyfriend money to persuade him to plead guilty, which White denied. According to the complaint, White paid $10,000 to the stripper to dance and have sex with him. The lawsuit was dismissed on October 7, 2020.

Health issues
In May 2012, White revealed that he had been diagnosed with Ménière's disease, a neurological disorder. He said, "It's like vertigo but on steroids." White claims that the disease was brought on because of a large fight he was involved in during his youth.

The UFC on Fuel TV 3: Korean Zombie vs. Poirier event was to be the first he had missed in 11 years with White staying home, adhering to medical advice.

White is undergoing Orthokine treatment for Ménière's disease, which he says has greatly reduced his symptoms.

In 2022, White stated he had undergone medical testing and was diagnosed with extremely high triglyceride levels and other irregularities. He was given 10.4 years left to live if he did not rectify the problems. White said that since then he has adhered to a ketogenic diet, which he says has remedied his sleep apnea and alleviated his leg pain.

Gambling
White is a recreational gambler. He plays high-stakes blackjack, and has been limited from playing at multiple casinos in Las Vegas. He states he plays $75,000 a hand, and if he wins the first couple of hands, he takes the $150,000 profit and leaves. White also gambles on sports. He stated in 2021 that the biggest sports bet he had placed was in 2007, when he wagered $1 million on Jermain Taylor to beat Kelly Pavlik. Taylor lost the bout by technical knockout, and White said about the experience, "I was in Cabo, relaxing having fun. That ruined my fun. Ruined my whole trip."

Altercation with his wife
During a 2023 New Year's Eve party at a nightclub in Cabo San Lucas, Mexico, White and his wife Anne were filmed arguing and then getting into a physical altercation with each other, with Anne slapping White and White slapping her back. Both have admitted to this and apologized for their actions, blaming it on the high amount of alcohol they had consumed. The UFC did not respond or address White's actions after the incident. The California Legislative Women's Caucus sent a letter to Ari Emanuel, CEO of Endeavor, the company that owns the UFC, to fire White. The letter was signed by California State Senator Nancy Skinner and California State Representative Cecilia Aguiar-Curry.

Awards
 Nevada Sportsman of the Year (2009)
 Wrestling Observer Newsletter Awards
 Promoter of the Year (2005–13; 2015–16)
 World MMA Awards
 Leading Man of the Year (2008–22)
 Armed Forces Foundation
 Patriot Award

References

External links

 
 

1969 births
American atheists
Former Roman Catholics
American chief executives
American people of Irish descent
Businesspeople from Las Vegas
Living people
Mixed martial arts executives
Nevada Republicans
People from Manchester, Connecticut
People with Ménière's Disease
Ultimate Fighting Championship
Wrestling Observer Newsletter award winners